Lakewood–Wadsworth (sometimes stylized as Lakewood•Wadsworth) is an elevated light rail station on the W Line of the RTD Rail system. It is located alongside West 13th Avenue on a bridge over Wadsworth Boulevard, in Lakewood, Colorado, after which the station is named.

The station opened on April 26, 2013,  on the West Corridor, built as part of the Regional Transportation District (RTD) FasTracks public transportation expansion plan and voter-approved sales tax increase for the Denver metropolitan area.

The station has a 1,000 space park and ride garage and bus stops served by RTD Bus routes.

References 

Transportation in Lakewood, Colorado
RTD light rail stations
W Line (RTD)
Railway stations in the United States opened in 2013
2013 establishments in Colorado
Transportation buildings and structures in Jefferson County, Colorado